St Mary's Parish Church, also known as the Church of St Mary the Virgin, in Ashford, Kent, England, dates to the late 13th century. It is now Grade I listed. There has been a church on the site since at least 1086, for one was mentioned in the Domesday Book.

Cranbrook native Comfort Starr, one of the founding members of Harvard College, was a warden at the church in the early 17th century.

See also
Listed buildings in Ashford, Kent

References

External links

Ashford, St Mary's
13th-century churches
Ashford, Kent